Baritones and French Horns is a  rpm album released in August 1958 by Prestige Records. The album is one of a series of releases attributed to the Prestige All Stars.  Each side of the album was a distinct date with distinct personnel. From a jazz.com review, Kenny Berger wrote, "Among the many innovative technological failures of the mid- and late- 1950s, the 16-rpm phonograph record stands as the industry's answer to the Edsel. One of Prestige's contributions to this auditory dustbin was an LP on steroids titled Baritones and French Horns under the supervision of vibist, composer, arranger, A&R man Teddy Charles. The baritone side of this album was reissued twice on LP and twice more on CD under John Coltrane's name [as Dakar], though Pepper Adams was the actual leader on these sessions."  The "french horns" side of the album was reissued as Prestige ST 8305, Curtis Fuller and Hampton Hawes with French Horns.

Track listing
Baritones
 "Dakar" (Teddy Charles) — 7:09
 "Mary's Blues" (Pepper Adams) — 6:47
 "Route 4" (Charles) — 6:55
 "Velvet Scene" (Waldron) — 4:53
 "Witches Pit" (Adams) — 6:42
 "Catwalk" (Charles) — 7:11

French Horns
 "Ronnie's Tune" (Ball, Zito) — 7:27
 "Roc And Troll" (Charles) — 7:11
 "A-Drift" (Zito) — 6:13
 "Lyriste" (Charles) — 6:00
 "Five Spot" (Amram) — 3:28
 "No Crooks" (Charles) — 6:26

Personnel
Baritones (recorded April 20, 1957), also released as Dakar under John Coltrane's name
 John Coltrane – tenor saxophone
 Cecil Payne – baritone saxophone - except track 4
 Pepper Adams – baritone saxophone
 Mal Waldron – piano
 Doug Watkins – bass
 Art Taylor – drums

French Horns (recorded May 18, 1957), also released as Curtis Fuller and Hampton Hawes with French Horns
 Julius Watkins – french horn
 David Amram – french horn
 Curtis Fuller – trombone
 Sahib Shihab – alto saxophone
 Addison Farmer – bass
 Jerry Segal – drums
 Hampton Hawes – piano (tracks 1, 2, 3, 5, 6)
 Teddy Charles – piano (track 4)

References

1957 albums
Pepper Adams albums
Prestige Records albums
Hard bop albums
Cool jazz albums